Burewala, is an administrative subdivision (tehsil) of Vehari District in the Punjab province of Pakistan. The city of Burewala is the headquarters of the tehsil.

Administration
The tehsil of Burewala is administratively subdivided into 32 Union Councils, these are:

References

External links
 Burewala Website

 

Vehari District
Tehsils of Punjab, Pakistan